Abbasabad (also Romanized as ‘Abbāsābād) is a village in Kuhestan Rural District, in the Central District of Behshahr County, Mazandaran Province, Iran.

References 

Populated places in Behshahr County